The Daughters of the Cincinnati is an historical, hereditary lineage organization founded in 1894 by women whose ancestors were officers in George Washington’s army and navy during the Revolutionary War.  The organization's activities are designed to expand and perpetuate the knowledge of the founding of the nation. In addition, the Daughters of the Cincinnati honor the contributions of their officer ancestors by giving college scholarships to the daughters of today's career military officers.

History 

The Daughters of the Cincinnati was founded in 1894. They adopted the name "Cincinnati" without getting the approval of the Society of the Cincinnati.

Membership and organization
Membership was originally limited to women who were descended from a member of the Society of the Cincinnati or of an officer in the Continental Army or Navy who died while in service. There were 200 members as of 1923 and the secretary's address is 271 Madison Ave #1408, New York 10016

The society has headquarters in New York and its members reside throughout the United States and in many foreign countries.  All members of the Daughters of the Cincinnati are descendants of officers who were entitled to original membership in the Society of the Cincinnati founded in 1783.

Scholarships
For over a hundred years the Daughters of the Cincinnati have raised funds to help hundreds of young women to pay their college tuitions. Scholarships are awarded to daughters of career military officers in the United States Army, Navy, Air Force, Marines, and Coast Guard.  Selection is based on both excellence and need.  The Daughters of the Cincinnati is a 501 (c) (3) non-profit organization.

Activities
Historical lectures, trips, and projects have been presented by the Daughters of the Cincinnati to the membership since 1894.  Daughters of the Cincinnati join in patriotic celebrations and historical programs with many other patriotic and heritage societies. In the 1970s the Daughters of the Cincinnati collected original correspondence and portraits of their ancestor officers.  These primary sources formed the core of a well regarded book, A Salute to Courage: The American Revolution as Seen Through Wartime Writings of Officers of the Continental Army and Navy from Documents Provided by The Daughters of the Cincinnati, edited by Dennis P. Ryan and published by Columbia University Press. One newspaper review commented "the book bridges two centuries with the words of those who were there and brings alive in modern eyes the hardships, horror, and patriotism of the Revolution."  Daughters of the Cincinnati is an approved lineage society, listed within the Hereditary Society Community of the United States of America.

References

External links 
Official Website
Daughters of the Cincinnati Records at the New-York Historical Society
The Hereditary Society Community of the United States of America

Lineage societies
Organizations established in 1894
1894 establishments in the United States
Non-profit organizations based in New York (state)
American Revolution veterans and lineage organizations